Iggy Arbuckle is an animated series that premiered in Canada on Teletoon in June 2007. Based on a comic strip from National Geographic Kids, the show is created by Guy Vasilovich, and focuses on a pig (Iggy Arbuckle) who happens to be a forest ranger, known in the series as a "Pig Ranger". The plot involves Iggy's attempts to protect the environmental structure of the fictional Kookamunga National Park. It was produced by Blueprint Entertainment, in association with C.O.R.E. toons, National Geographic Kids, and Teletoon and distributed by Oasis International. The series was cancelled on October 10, 2007 after a single season.

The series also aired in Australia on ABC Kids, in the United Kingdom on Jetix, and on Pop. Oasis International, the Canadian distributor, also licensed the series to channels such as Cartoon Network (in Korea, Southeast Asia, India, and the Philippines) and Canal + SA and TPS in France. It was also broadcast on Saturday mornings on Toonattik on ITV and CITV, and weekday mornings on Action Stations! on ITV4 and CITV.

Plot
The show takes place in a fictional national park known as the "Kookamunga" (The "Kook" for short, although there is the Cucamonga Valley in California). The park is looked after by a white pig named Iggy Arbuckle, who is the creator of the "Pig Rangers", a fictional type of forest ranger. He is accompanied by a beaver named Jiggers, who is the only other canonical Pig Ranger in the show.

Iggy's nemesis is a catfish named Stu, who is always trying to use the Kookamunga to obtain wealth. Most of the stories revolve around Iggy and Jiggers' efforts to save the park's ecosystem from Catfish Stu.

Recurring Locations
The most prominent locations in the park include a volcano called Mount Kaboom, which Jiggers is constantly afraid will erupt, despite Iggy saying it has been dormant for centuries. The first story in the debut episode focused on this matter. Three other recurring places are a lake called Gottalottawatta, in which character Catfish Stu frequently dwells, an Iceland called Brainfreeze and a town called Mooseknuckle.

Production
Iggy Arbuckle began as a comic strip entitled Iggy Arbuckle: Nature Freak! that premiered in National Geographic Kids in the June 2004 issue. It was, to date, the only issue of the comic strip; in which the characters Iggy Arbuckle, Jiggers and Zoop made their first appearances. The plot involved Iggy and Jiggers trying to find an acorn so Iggy could make an acorn squash pie for Zoop as a birthday present. Created by Guy Vasilovich, director of Kangaroo Jack: G'Day U.S.A.!, writer for Moville Mysteries, and production designer for Hey Arnold!: The Movie, the series is loosely based on his childhood experiences while living in Tomahawk, Wisconsin.

On April 11, 2005, Oasis International, Blueprint Entertainment and Teletoon announced that they were coproducing an animated series based on the comic. The series would be targeted at children ages six to eleven and feature twenty-six episodes each comprising two eleven-minute sub-episodes. The animation was done entirely in Flash, with over 100 workers involved in the series' creation. National Geographic holds the US distribution rights for the series, while Blueprint holds the international rights. Jetix Europe acquired the European broadcast and DVD distribution rights to the series in February 2007.

In January 2008, Oasis International sold distribution rights of Iggy Arbuckle to Canal + SA and TPS in France, to ABC in Australia, and to the variants of Cartoon Network in Southeast Asia, Korea, the Philippines, Australia, and India. The series was licensed for US broadcast by Animania HD, and is currently licensed for distribution in a total of seventy territories.

Characters

The characters in the show are drawn as animal species, including many types of mammals, reptiles, birds, fish, and even insects. Rather than referring to the male characters as "men" and the females as "women" in the appropriate contexts, the characters refer to each other by their species (though the words "lady/ladies," "gentleman/men," "girls," and "boys" exist in their vocabulary). The wild animals and the anthropomorphized characters understand each other quite well, and the wild ones seem quite intelligent.

A gag in the series is that whenever a character gets conked on the head, bluebirds start flying around their heads. When the character comes to, they fly away.

Episodes

Reception
Iggy Arbuckle has been received well in Europe, with Jetix Europe receiving strong sales on the show. In the United Kingdom, its biggest timeslot is among young male viewers. As of Autumn 2008, it ranks among the top shows viewed by European children, in the markets in which Jetix has aired the show.

Awards and nominations
As of March 2008, the sub-episode "Petition Impossible", of the episode "Yawny Come Lately/Petition Impossible" was among the finalists of the children's programs nominated for the 2008 Canadian Screenwriting Awards. On April 14, the day the award winners were declared, the episode won the Children/Preschool category award. The episode "Idle Worship/There's Something about Berries" won a Gemini award for Best Writing in a Children's Series, during the 23rd anniversary of the Gemini awards. Jonathan Wilson and David Berni, the voices of Iggy and Jiggers, respectively, received a Gemini nomination for Best Individual or Ensemble Performance in an Animated Program or Series, for the same episode, although it lost to Gordon Tootoosis, Raven Brass, Trevor Cameron, Lorne Cardinal, Taylor Cook, Eric Jackson, Andrea Menard, and DerRic Starlight, for The Guardians.

Merchandise

On November 1, 2007, an online game based on the series, The Great Kookamunga Challenge, was launched. Hosted on the Teletoon web site and created by Zinc Roe Design, the game was an online race in which players explored the Kookamunga National Park in search of 115 "checkpoints."  At each checkpoint, they could earn points by playing games, answering trivia questions about the series, or completing group activities. The first players who completed the entire challenge won real-world prizes, including a digital camera and items from National Geographic Kids. The game ran for six weeks.

The entire series of Iggy Arbuckle was released on DVD in 2007 in Australia.

References

External links

 

2000s American animated television series
2000s American workplace comedy television series
2007 American television series debuts
2007 American television series endings
2000s Canadian animated television series
2000s Canadian workplace comedy television series
2007 Canadian television series debuts
2007 Canadian television series endings
American children's animated comedy television series
American flash animated television series
Animated series based on comics
Animated television series about pigs
Canadian children's animated comedy television series
Canadian flash animated television series
English-language television shows
Jetix original programming
National Geographic (American TV channel) original programming
Teletoon original programming
Television shows based on comic strips
Television shows filmed in Toronto
Television shows set in California